This is a list of the best-selling singles in 1996 in Japan, as reported by Oricon.

References

1996 in Japanese music
1996
Oricon
Japanese music-related lists